Chance Adams (born August 10, 1994) is an American professional baseball pitcher who is a free agent. He has played in Major League Baseball (MLB) for the New York Yankees and Kansas City Royals.

Career
Adams attended Chaparral High School in Scottsdale, Arizona. He played college baseball at Yavapai College for two years before transferring to Dallas Baptist University. After one year at Dallas Baptist, Adams was drafted by the New York Yankees in the fifth round of the 2015 Major League Baseball Draft.

New York Yankees
Adams made his professional debut with the Staten Island Yankees of the Class A-Short Season New York-Penn League and was later promoted to the Charleston RiverDogs of the Class A South Atlantic League and Tampa Yankees of the Class A-Advanced Florida State League. He posted a combined 3–1 win–loss record, 1.78 earned run average (ERA) and 0.93 walks plus hits per inning pitched in  combined innings between the three teams. Adams was converted into a starting pitcher in 2016 and started the year with Tampa, and after pitching to a 5–0 record and 2.65 ERA in 12 games, was promoted to the Trenton Thunder of the Class AA Eastern League in June, where he finished the season with an 8–1 record and 2.07 ERA. In 2017, Adams pitched for both Trenton and the Scranton/Wilkes-Barre RailRiders of the Class AAA International League, posting a combined 15–5 record and 2.45 ERA in  total innings pitched between both teams.

Adams began the 2018 season with Scranton/Wilkes-Barre. He was called up to the major leagues to face the Boston Red Sox in his first career start on August 4.

Adams was designated for assignment on December 18, 2019.

Kansas City Royals
The Yankees traded Adams to the Kansas City Royals for minor league prospect infielder Cristian Perez on December 23, 2019. He made his Royals debut on August 24, 2020, against the St. Louis Cardinals. With the 2020 Kansas City Royals, Adams appeared in 6 games, compiling a 0–0 record with 9.35 ERA and 6 strikeouts in 8.2 innings pitched. Adams underwent Tommy John surgery in October 2020, and would miss the 2021 season. On November 20, 2020, Adams was outrighted off of the 40-man roster. He elected free agency on November 7, 2021.

References

External links

1994 births
Living people
Baseball players from Scottsdale, Arizona
Major League Baseball pitchers
New York Yankees players
Kansas City Royals players
Yavapai Roughriders baseball players
Dallas Baptist Patriots baseball players
Staten Island Yankees players
Charleston RiverDogs players
Tampa Yankees players
Trenton Thunder players
Scranton/Wilkes-Barre RailRiders players